Amy MacDonald may refer to:

People 
 Amy MacDonald (writer) (born 1951), American author
 Amy McDonald (Scottish footballer) (born 1985), Scottish footballer
 Amy Macdonald (born 1987), Scottish singer-songwriter
 Amy McDonald (Australian footballer) (born 1998), Australian footballer

Fictional 
 Amy Barlow, character on the British soap opera Coronation Street, also called Amy McDonald

See also 
 Aimi MacDonald (born 1942), Scottish-born comedian and actress